was a village located in Kitauwa District, Ehime Prefecture, Japan.

As of 2000, the village had an estimated population of 1,933 and a density of 21.75 persons per km². The total area was 88.89 km².

On January 1, 2005, Hiroshi, along with the town of Hiromi (also from Kitauwa District), was merged to create the new town of Kihoku.

External links
Official website of Kihoku 

Dissolved municipalities of Ehime Prefecture